Werner Hartmann (born 20 February 1942) is an Austrian wrestler. He competed in the men's Greco-Roman flyweight at the 1960 Summer Olympics.

References

External links
 

1942 births
Living people
Austrian male sport wrestlers
Olympic wrestlers of Austria
Wrestlers at the 1960 Summer Olympics
Sportspeople from Vorarlberg
People from Feldkirch District